Yacheyka is a rural locality (a selo) and the administrative center of Yacheyskoye Rural Settlement, Ertilsky District, Voronezh Oblast, Russia. The population was 525 as of 2010. There are 12 streets.

Geography 
Yacheyka is located 15 km west of Ertil (the district's administrative centre) by road. Slastyonka is the nearest rural locality.

References 

Rural localities in Ertilsky District